Matthew Bowman (born 31 January 1990) is an English footballer who played once for Sheffield Wednesday. Although an Academy player he was called up to the senior squad at the start of 2006–07 season to ease the club's injury problems. Matt made good progress in the under-18s and reserves before earning his first-team debut at Hillsborough against Wrexham in the League Cup in August 2006, where at the age of 16 years and 205 days, he became the youngest outfield player ever to appear for Wednesday. He was released by the club at the end of the season, however.

References

External links 

1990 births
Living people
Footballers from Barnsley
English footballers
Sheffield Wednesday F.C. players
Association football forwards